Sombrero Island may refer to one of several islands:

 Sombrero, Anguilla, in the Caribbean

Islands in the Philippines 

 Sombrero Island (Batangas)
 Sombrero Island (Camarines Sur)
 Sombrero Island (Iloilo)
 Sombrero Island (Palawan)